George Stoughton (1581–25 January 1624), of Stoughton, near Guildford, Surrey, was an English politician.

He was the son of Lawrence Stoughton, MP and his wife Rose Ive, the stepdaughter of William Hammond, MP. He was the brother of Nicholas Stoughton, MP.

He was elected in 1614 a Member (MP) of the Parliament of England both for Guildford and for Newtown, Isle of Wight, choosing  to sit for Guildford.

References

1581 births
1624 deaths
People from Surrey
Members of the Parliament of England for Guildford
English MPs 1614